David Suter may refer to:

 David Suter (artist) (born 1949), American artist
 David Suter (biologist) (born 1978), Swiss biologist